The Philadelphia Flyers are an American ice hockey team based in Philadelphia, Pennsylvania. They compete in the National Hockey League (NHL) Eastern Conference's Metropolitan Division. Since their inaugural season in 1967, the team has played its home games on Broad Street in South Philadelphia, first at the Spectrum from 1967 to 1996 and currently at the Wells Fargo Center since 1996. In 51 completed seasons, the team has won the Stanley Cup as NHL champions twice and has qualified for the playoffs thirty-nine times. They have played more than 400 playoff games, winning 221. As of the end of the  season, Philadelphia has won more than 2,000 regular season games, the 7th-highest victory total among NHL teams and the most among non-Original Six teams. The Flyers also possess an all-time .575 points percentage, the third highest among NHL teams.

The Flyers were founded in 1967 and won consecutive Stanley Cup championships in 1974 and 1975, the first expansion team to do so. The team has since lost in six return trips to the Stanley Cup Finals in 1976, 1980, 1985, 1987, 1997 and 2010.

Table key

Year by year

See also
List of NHL seasons

Notes

References

General

Specific

 
Philadelphia Flyers
seasons